Bastar division is an administrative division of Chhattisgarh state in central India. It includes the districts of Bastar, Dantewada, Bijapur, Narayanpur, Sukma,  Kondagaon and Kanker.

Bastar Division was created in 1999, when the larger Bastar District was divided into the present-day districts of Jagdalpur, Dantewada, and Kanker. In 2000 the division became part of the newly created state of Chhattisgarh. Later in 2007, Bijapur and Narayanpur districts were also divided, and Sukma and Kondagaon  in 2012. The present Divisional Commissioner is Mr. Shyam Dhawade (IAS).

Bastar is the southernmost region in the state of Chhattisgarh. It is a forested mineral rich region with a population of 2.5 million people and a rich cultural heritage. Spread over a geographical area 39,117 km2, it is divided into seven administrative districts: Kanker, Narayanpur, Kondagaon, Bijapur, Dantewada, Jagdalpur and Sukma. An estimated 19, 98, 987 voters live in the Bastar Lok Sabha (parliamentary) constituency and an estimated 16, 39, 249 voters live in the Kanker Lok Sabha (parliamentary) constituency. There were 12 Member of Legislative assembly constituency seats, in Bastar Division, Jagdalpur City, Bastar (Jagdalpur rural), Chitrakot (Jagdalpur west), Dantewada, Konta, Bijapur, Kondagaun, Narayanpur, Kanker, Bhanupratappur, Antagarh and Keshkal. In recent times, the area has become the hub of Naxal or Left Wing Extremism (LWE) related conflict. Government statistics highlight the disproportionate number of incidents of violence and deaths in this area. The latest census of India (2011) indicates declining population trend in the LWE districts in Bastar.

Some of the most vulnerable population groups in India live in Bastar. The area is home to a number of different tribal groups (Scheduled tribes) and a variety of languages and dialects are spoken locally. Human developmental shortfalls among these groups has given rise to left-wing extremism in the region. Local agriculture, animal husbandry and forest based livelihood systems as well as weekly markets and transport networks have been disrupted by prolonged conflict. In a region where standard human development indicators were relatively low to begin with, widespread absence and worsening access to healthcare, education, drinking water, sanitation and food is creating an alarming situation. Availability of state functionaries responsible for delivering these basic minimum services in the conflict affected areas is also very low. Not surprisingly the health and nutrition indicators of all the districts are well below the state average.

Divisions of Chhattisgarh